The 1974 Navy Midshipmen football team represented the United States Naval Academy (USNA) as an independent during the 1974 NCAA Division I football season. The team was led by second-year head coach George Welsh.

Schedule

Personnel

Not listed (missing number/class/position): Carl Sharperson

Season summary

vs Army

75th meeting; President Gerald Ford in attendance

References

Navy
Navy Midshipmen football seasons
Navy Midshipmen football